This is a list of members of the Malaysian Parliament who have served in both the Dewan Negara and the Dewan Rakyat during their federal parliamentary career.

Most people in the list represented different states in the Dewan Rakyat. Nobody has ever represented different states in the Dewan Negara, although various attempts have been made.

This list includes MPs who served in the past and who continue to serve in the present.

This is a list of members of the Malaysian Parliament who have served in both the Dewan Negara and the Dewan Rakyat during their federal parliamentary career.

Most people in the list represented different states in the Dewan Rakyat. Nobody has ever represented different states in the Dewan Negara, although various attempts have been made.

This list includes MPs who served in the past and who continue to serve in the present.

List of people who have served in both houses

References

Parliament of Malaysia